Trinitrotoluene, more commonly known as TNT, more specifically 2,4,6-trinitrotoluene, and by its preferred IUPAC name 2-methyl-1,3,5-trinitrobenzene, is a chemical compound with the formula C6H2(NO2)3CH3.  TNT is occasionally used as a reagent in chemical synthesis, but it is best known as an explosive material with convenient handling properties.  The explosive yield of TNT is considered to be the standard comparative convention of bombs and asteroid impacts. In chemistry, TNT is used to generate charge transfer salts.

History 
TNT was first prepared in 1863 by German chemist Julius Wilbrand and originally used as a yellow dye. Its potential as an explosive was not recognized for three decades, mainly because it was too difficult to detonate because it was less sensitive than alternatives. Its explosive properties were first discovered in 1891 by another German chemist, Carl Häussermann. TNT can be safely poured when liquid into shell cases, and is so insensitive that in 1910 it was exempted from the UK's Explosives Act 1875 and was not considered an explosive for the purposes of manufacture and storage.

The German armed forces adopted it as a filling for artillery shells in 1902. TNT-filled armour-piercing shells would explode after they had penetrated the armour of British capital ships, whereas the British Lyddite-filled shells tended to explode upon striking armour, thus expending much of their energy outside the ship. The British started replacing Lyddite with TNT in 1907.

The United States Navy continued filling armour-piercing shells with explosive D after some other nations had switched to TNT, but began filling naval mines, bombs, depth charges, and torpedo warheads with burster charges of crude grade B TNT with the color of brown sugar and requiring an explosive booster charge of granular crystallized grade A TNT for detonation.  High-explosive shells were filled with grade A TNT, which became preferred for other uses as industrial chemical capacity became available for removing xylene and similar hydrocarbons from the toluene feedstock and other nitrotoluene isomer byproducts from the nitrating reactions.

Preparation 
In industry, TNT is produced in a three-step process. First, toluene is nitrated with a mixture of sulfuric and nitric acid to produce mononitrotoluene (MNT). The MNT is separated and then renitrated to dinitrotoluene (DNT). In the final step, the DNT is nitrated to trinitrotoluene (TNT) using an anhydrous mixture of nitric acid and oleum. Nitric acid is consumed by the manufacturing process, but the diluted sulfuric acid can be reconcentrated and reused.  After nitration, TNT is stabilized by a process called sulfitation, where the crude TNT is treated with aqueous sodium sulfite solution to remove less stable isomers of TNT and other undesired reaction products.  The rinse water from sulfitation is known as red water and is a significant pollutant and waste product of TNT manufacture.

Control of nitrogen oxides in feed nitric acid is very important because free nitrogen dioxide can result in oxidation of the methyl group of toluene.  This reaction is highly exothermic and carries with it the risk of a runaway reaction leading to an explosion.

In the laboratory, 2,4,6-trinitrotoluene is produced by a two-step process.  A nitrating mixture of concentrated nitric and sulfuric acids is used to nitrate toluene to a mixture of mono- and di-nitrotoluene isomers, with careful cooling to maintain temperature.  The nitrated toluenes are then separated, washed with dilute sodium bicarbonate to remove oxides of nitrogen, and then carefully nitrated with a mixture of fuming nitric acid and sulfuric acid.

Applications 
TNT is one of the most commonly used explosives for military, industrial, and mining applications. TNT has been used in conjunction with hydraulic fracturing (popularly known as fracking), a process used to recover oil and gas from shale formations. The technique involves displacing and detonating nitroglycerin in hydraulically induced fractures followed by wellbore shots using pelletized TNT.

TNT is valued partly because of its insensitivity to shock and friction, with reduced risk of accidental detonation compared to more sensitive explosives such as nitroglycerin. TNT melts at 80 °C (176 °F), far below the temperature at which it will spontaneously detonate, allowing it to be poured or safely combined with other explosives.  TNT neither absorbs nor dissolves in water, which allows it to be used effectively in wet environments.  To detonate, TNT must be triggered by a pressure wave from a starter explosive, called an explosive booster.

Although blocks of TNT are available in various sizes (e.g. 250 g, 500 g, 1,000 g), it is more commonly encountered in synergistic explosive blends comprising a variable percentage of TNT plus other ingredients. Examples of explosive blends containing TNT include:
 Amatex (ammonium nitrate and RDX)
 Amatol (ammonium nitrate)
 Ammonal (ammonium nitrate and aluminium powder plus sometimes charcoal).
 Baratol (barium nitrate and wax)
 Composition B (RDX and paraffin wax)
 Composition H6
 Cyclotol (RDX)
 Ednatol
 Hexanite (hexanitrodiphenylamine)
 Minol
 Octol
 Pentolite
 Picratol
 Tetrytol
 Torpex
 Tritonal

Explosive character 
Upon detonation, TNT undergoes a decomposition equivalent to the reaction
 2 C7H5N3O6 → 3 N2 + 5 H2 + 12 CO + 2 C
plus some of the reactions
  + CO →  + C
and
 2 CO →  + C.
The reaction is exothermic but has a high activation energy in the gas phase (~62 kcal/mol). The condensed phases (solid or liquid) show markedly lower activation energies of roughly 35 kcal/mol due to unique bimolecular decomposition routes at elevated densities.  Because of the production of carbon, TNT explosions have a sooty appearance.  Because TNT has an excess of carbon, explosive mixtures with oxygen-rich compounds can yield more energy per kilogram than TNT alone.  During the 20th century, amatol, a mixture of TNT with ammonium nitrate was a widely used military explosive.

TNT can be detonated with a high velocity initiator or by efficient concussion. For many years, TNT used to be the reference point for the Figure of Insensitivity. TNT had a rating of exactly 100 on the "F of I" scale. The reference has since been changed to a more sensitive explosive called RDX, which has an F of I rating of 80.

Energy content 

The heat of detonation utilized by NIST to define a tonne of TNT equivalent is 1000 cal/g or 1000 kcal/kg, 4.184 MJ/kg or 4.184 GJ/ton.  The energy density of TNT is used as a reference point for many other explosives, including nuclear weapons, the energy content of which is measured in equivalent kilotons (~4.184 terajoules or 4.184 TJ or 1.162 GWh) or megatons (~4.184 petajoules or 4.184 PJ or 1.162 TWh) of TNT. The heat of combustion however is 14.5 megajoules per kilogram or 14.5 MJ/kg or 4.027 kWh/kg, which requires that some of the carbon in TNT react with atmospheric oxygen, which does not occur in the initial event.

For comparison, gunpowder contains 3 megajoules per kilogram, dynamite contains 7.5 megajoules per kilogram, and gasoline contains 47.2 megajoules per kilogram (though gasoline requires an oxidant, so an optimized gasoline and O2 mixture contains 10.4 megajoules per kilogram).

Detection 
Various methods can be used to detect TNT, including optical and electrochemical sensors and explosive-sniffing dogs. In 2013, researchers from the Indian Institutes of Technology using noble-metal quantum clusters could detect TNT at the sub-zeptomolar (10−18 mol/m3) level.

Safety and toxicity 
TNT is poisonous, and skin contact can cause skin irritation, causing the skin to turn a bright yellow-orange color. During the First World War, female munition workers who handled the chemical found that their skin turned bright yellow, which resulted in their acquiring the nickname "canary girls" or simply "canaries".

People exposed to TNT over a prolonged period tend to experience anemia and abnormal liver functions. Blood and liver effects, spleen enlargement and other harmful effects on the immune system have also been found in animals that ingested or breathed trinitrotoluene. There is evidence that TNT adversely affects male fertility. TNT is listed as a possible human carcinogen, with carcinogenic effects demonstrated in animal experiments with rats, although effects upon humans so far amount to none (according to IRIS of March 15, 2000). Consumption of TNT produces red urine through the presence of breakdown products and not blood as sometimes believed.

Some military testing grounds are contaminated with wastewater from munitions programs, including contamination of surface and subsurface waters which may be colored pink because of the presence of TNT. Such contamination, called "pink water", may be difficult and expensive to remedy.

TNT is prone to exudation of dinitrotoluenes and other isomers of trinitrotoluene when projectiles containing TNT are stored at higher temperatures in warmer climates. Exudation of impurities leads to formation of pores and cracks (which in turn cause increased shock sensitivity). Migration of the exudated liquid into the fuze screw thread can form fire channels, increasing the risk of accidental detonation. Fuze malfunction can also result from the liquid migrating into the fuze mechanism. Calcium silicate is mixed with TNT to mitigate the tendency towards exudation.

Pink and red water

Pink water and red water are two distinct types of wastewater related to trinitrotoluene. Pink water is produced from equipment washing processes after munitions filling or demilitarization operations, and as such is generally saturated with the maximum amount of TNT that will dissolve in water (about 150 parts per million (ppm).) However it has an indefinite composition that depends on the exact process; in particular, it may also contain cyclotrimethylenetrinitramine (RDX) if the plant uses TNT/RDX mixtures, or HMX if TNT/HMX is used.  Red water (also known as "Sellite water") is produced during the process used to purify the crude TNT.  It has a complex composition containing more than a dozen aromatic compounds, but the principal components are inorganic salts (sodium sulfate, sodium sulfite, sodium nitrite and sodium nitrate) and sulfonated nitroaromatics.

Pink water is actually colorless at the time of generation, whereas red water can be colorless or a very pale red.  The color is produced by photolytic reactions under the influence of sunlight. Despite the names, red and pink water are not necessarily different shades; the color depends mainly on the duration of solar exposure. If exposed long enough, "pink" water will become dark brown.

Because of the toxicity of TNT, the discharge of pink water to the environment has been prohibited in the US and many other countries for decades, but ground contamination may exist in very old plants. However, RDX and tetryl contamination is usually considered more problematic, as TNT has very low soil mobility.  Red water is significantly more toxic and as such it has always been considered hazardous waste. It has traditionally been disposed of by evaporation to dryness (as the toxic components are not volatile), followed by incineration. Much research has been conducted to develop better disposal processes.

Ecological impact 
Because of its suitability in construction and demolition, TNT has become the most widely used explosive and thus its toxicity is the most characterized and reported. Residual TNT from manufacture, storage, and use can pollute water, soil, the atmosphere, and the biosphere.

The concentration of TNT in contaminated soil can reach 50 g/kg of soil, where the highest concentrations can be found on or near the surface. In September 2001, the United States Environmental Protection Agency (USEPA) declared TNT a pollutant whose removal is a priority. The USEPA maintains that TNT levels in soil should not exceed 17.2 grams per kilogram of soil and 0.01 milligrams per litre of water.

Aqueous solubility 
Dissolution is a measure of the rate that solid TNT in contact with water is dissolved. The relatively low aqueous solubility of TNT causes solid particles to be continuously released to the environment over extended periods of time.  Studies have shown that TNT dissolves slower in saline water than in freshwater. However, when salinity is altered, TNT dissolves at the same speed.  Because TNT is moderately soluble in water, it can migrate through subsurface soil, and cause groundwater contamination.

Soil adsorption 
Adsorption is a measure of the distribution between soluble and sediment adsorbed contaminants following attainment of equilibrium. TNT and its transformation products are known to adsorb to surface soils and sediments, where they undergo reactive transformation or remained stored.  The movement or organic contaminants through soils is a function of their ability to associate with the mobile phase (water) and a stationary phase (soil). Materials that associate strongly with soils move slowly through soil.
The association constant for TNT with soil is 2.7 to 11 L/kg of soil.  This means that TNT has a one- to tenfold tendency to adhere to soil particulates than not when introduced into the soil.   Hydrogen bonding and ion exchange are two suggested mechanisms of adsorption between the nitro functional groups and soil colloids.

The number of functional groups on TNT influences the ability to adsorb into soil. Adsorption coefficient values have been shown to increase with an increase in the number of amino groups. Thus, adsorption of the TNT decomposition product 2,4-diamino-6-nitrotoluene (2,4-DANT) was greater than that  for 4-amino-2,6-dinitrotoluene (4-ADNT), which was greater than that for TNT.   Lower adsorption coefficients for 2,6-DNT compared to 2,4-DNT can be attributed to the steric hindrance of the NO2 group in the ortho position.

Research has shown that in freshwater environments, with high abundances of Ca2+, the adsorption of TNT and its transformation products to soils and sediments may be lower than observed in a saline environment, dominated by K+ and Na+. Therefore, when considering the adsorption of TNT, the type of soil or sediment and the ionic composition and strength of the ground water are important factors.

The association constants for TNT and its degradation products with clays have been determined. Clay minerals have a significant effect on the adsorption of energetic compounds. Soil properties, such as organic carbon content and cation exchange capacity have significant impacts on the adsorption coefficients.

Additional studies have shown that the mobility of TNT degradation products is likely to be lower "than TNT in subsurface environments where specific adsorption to clay minerals dominates the sorption process."  Thus, the mobility of TNT and its transformation products are dependent on the characteristics of the sorbent. The mobility of TNT in groundwater and soil has been extrapolated from "sorption and desorption isotherm models determined with humic acids, in aquifer sediments, and soils".  From these models, it is predicted that TNT has a low retention and transports readily in the environment.

Compared to other explosives, TNT has a higher association constant with soil, meaning it adheres more with soil than with water. Conversely, other explosives, such as RDX and HMX with low association constants (ranging from 0.06 to 7.3 L/kg and 0 to 1.6 L/kg respectively) can move more rapidly in water.

Chemical breakdown 
TNT is a reactive molecule and is particularly prone to react with reduced components of sediments or photodegradation in the presence of sunlight. TNT is thermodynamically and kinetically capable of reacting with a wide number of components of many environmental systems. This includes wholly abiotic reactants, like hydrogen sulfide, Fe2+, or microbial communities, both oxic and anoxic and photochemical degradation.

Soils with high clay contents or small particle sizes and high total organic carbon content have been shown to promote TNT transformation. Possible TNT transformations include reduction of one, two, or three nitro-moieties to amines and coupling of amino transformation products to form dimers. Formation of the two monoamino transformation products, 2-ADNT and 4-ADNT, is energetically favored, and therefore is observed in contaminated soils and ground water. The diamino products are energetically less favorable, and even less likely are the triamino products.

The transformation of TNT is significantly enhanced under anaerobic conditions as well as under highly reducing conditions. TNT transformations in soils can occur both biologically and abiotically.

Photolysis is a major process that impacts the transformation of energetic compounds. The alteration of a molecule in photolysis occurs by direct absorption of light energy or by the transfer of energy from a photosensitized compound. Phototransformation of TNT "results in the formation of nitrobenzenes, benzaldehydes, azodicarboxylic acids, and nitrophenols, as a result of the oxidation of methyl groups, reduction of nitro groups, and dimer formation."

Evidence of the photolysis of TNT has been seen due to the color change to pink of TNT-containing wastewaters when exposed to sunlight. Photolysis is more rapid in river water than in distilled water. Ultimately, photolysis affects the fate of TNT primarily in the aquatic environment but could also affect the fate of TNT in soil when the soil surface is exposed to sunlight.

Biodegradation 
The ligninolytic physiological phase and manganese peroxidase system of fungi can cause a very limited amount of mineralization of TNT in a liquid culture, though not in soil. An organism capable of the remediation of large amounts of TNT in soil has yet to be discovered. Both wild and transgenic plants can phytoremediate explosives from soil and water.

See also 
  
 Dynamite
 Environmental fate of TNT
 IMX-101
 List of explosives used during World War II
 Phlegmatized
 RE factor
 Table of explosive detonation velocities
 TNT equivalent
 Webster's test

References

External links 

 Dynamite and TNT at The Periodic Table of Videos (University of Nottingham)
 youtube.com video showing the shockwave and typical black smoke cloud from detonation of 160 kilograms of pure TNT
 CDC – NIOSH Pocket Guide to Chemical Hazards

Explosive chemicals
Immunotoxins
Nitrotoluenes